Magdalena Grzywa (born 15 September 1979) is a Polish biathlete. She competed in two events at the 2006 Winter Olympics.

References

External links
 

1979 births
Living people
Biathletes at the 2006 Winter Olympics
Polish female biathletes
Olympic biathletes of Poland
People from Kraków County